Mosman Village Church (formally known as St Clement's Anglican Church) is an Anglican church located at 144 Raglan Street, Mosman, New South Wales, Australia. The church held its first public church service on Sunday, 26 August 1888.

The church holds 3 services each Sunday at 8am (a traditional Anglican Prayer Book service), 10am (a family focussed service with kids program) and 5:30pm (a more informal church service).

The church's location in Mosman, a scenic and affluent suburb of Sydney, also makes it a popular venue for weddings and other events.

History 
St Clement's Anglican Church was opened in August 1888, located on the same site as today at the corner of Canrobert Street and Queen Street in Mosman, New South Wales.

After 135 years, the church "announced a name change as part of a major re-brand designed to encourage local worshippers back to the Raglan Street parish."

Vision 
Mosman Village Church's vision is "to know Jesus and make Jesus known". In order to realise this vision, the church has a 4-part strategy:

 Gather – To be a gathering church where its members regularly gather for church.
 Grow – To be a relational church where people are growing in their relationships with each other and with God.
 Give – To be a serving church where people generously give of their finances, time and attention.
 Go – To be a evangelistic church where people take the gospel of Jesus Christ with them and share it with people in their sphere of influence.

Schools 
The church works closely with Mosman Preparatory School, Mosman Public School and Mosman High School helping the schools' various religious education programs.

Building and Architecture 
The church building is an example of Gothic Revival architecture. The church's architecture is characterized by its high, vaulted ceilings, pointed arches, and stained glass windows. The interior of the church is decorated with intricate wood carvings, stone masonry, and decorative plasterwork.

References

External links 
 
 Major Rebrand: St Clement’s Anglican Church enters a new era after 135 years in Mosman

Anglican church buildings in Sydney
Mosman, New South Wales